Zieria caducibracteata is a plant in the citrus family Rutaceae and is endemic to New South Wales.  It is a tall shrub or small tree with leaves composed of three lance-shaped leaflets. In early spring there are clusters of small white flowers with four petals near the ends of the branches.

Description
The two surfaces of the leaflets are different shades of green, the lower surface covered with velvety hairs.

Flowering occurs from late August to September.

Taxonomy and naming
Zieria caducibracteata was first formally described in 2002 by James Andrew Armstrong from a specimen collected near the Princes Highway between Milton and Lake Conjola. The description was published in Australian Systematic Botany. The specific epithet (caducibracteata) is derived from the Latin words caducus meaning "deciduous" or "falling" and bractea meaning "scale" or "small leaf".

Distribution and habitat
This zieria is found between the Colo River and the Batemans Bay district in New South Wales, where it grows in forest and the edges of rainforest in sandy soil, mainly near escarpments.

References

External links
 

caducibracteata
Sapindales of Australia
Flora of New South Wales
Plants described in 2002